The Cape Police Memorial is a South African national heritage site located in Kimberley in the Northern Cape province. It commemorates the losses of the unit during the Anglo-Boer War.

In 1994, it was described in the Government Gazette as

It features a Boer gun captured during a skirmish in the war.

See also
Siege of Kimberley

References
 South African Heritage Resource Agency database

Buildings and structures in Kimberley, Northern Cape
Second Boer War memorials